Oberwald is a village in the municipality of Obergoms in Goms District in the canton of Valais in Switzerland.

It is situated at an elevation of 1,377 m and had a population of 277 in December 2007. It is located at the end of the Goms, directly before the Furka and Grimsel passes, underneath the Rhône River source at the Rhône Glacier.  It is also the startpoint of the Furka Tunnel.  Most inhabitants live off tourism or sheep farming.

Oberwald was an independent municipality until January 1, 2009, when it merged with Ulrichen and Obergesteln to form the municipality of Obergoms.

References

External links

 http://www.oberwald.ch

Former municipalities of Valais
Ski areas and resorts in Switzerland
Populated places on the Rhône
Populated riverside places in Switzerland